Raoul Jean Josset (9 December 1892 – 29 June 1957) was a French-born American sculptor. He was born in Tours.

During the First World War, he worked as an interpreter for American forces in France. He was a pupil of Antoine Bourdelle between 1920 and 1926. He came to Chicago, Illinois, in 1932 with his longtime collaborator Jose Martin to pursue a job with the Northwestern Terra Cotta Company only to find the job closed, but developed plenty of work, first in Illinois, briefly with Cowan Pottery in Lakewood, Ohio, and then principally in Texas.  In 1953 he was elected into the National Academy of Design as an Associate Academician.

Main works
 The sculptures of the bell tower and a Christ on a cross in the church of Roupy, 1922
 Monument to the dead of the 1914–1918 war in Châtillon-sur-Seine
Sculpted pylons, Lincoln Memorial Bridge between Vincennes, Indiana and Illinois, 1933
Darius-Girėnas Memorial, Marquette Park, Chicago, Illinois, 1935
Immortal 32 Centennial Monument, Gonzales Memorial Museum, Gonzales, Texas, 1936
Spirit of the Centennial Statue, Administration Building of the Texas Centennial Exposition (now The Women's Museum), Fair Park, Dallas, Texas, 1936
Work, Houston City Hall, Houston, Texas, 1936 (with Matchett Herring Coe)
Winged Angel Statue, Monument Hill and Kreische Brewery State Historic Sites, La Grange, Texas, 1936
Fannin Memorial Monument, Goliad State Park and Historic Site, Goliad, Texas, 1939
Excelsior, 1939 New York World's Fair, New York State Pavilion, 1939
George Childress Statue, Washington-on-the-Brazos Historical Site, Washington, Texas, 1939

References

External links

 

1892 births
1957 deaths
Architectural sculptors
Artists from Tours, France
20th-century French sculptors
French male sculptors
Olympic competitors in art competitions
French emigrants to the United States